White Boy Rick is a 2018 American crime drama film directed by Yann Demange and written by Andy Weiss, Logan Miller, and Noah Miller. The film stars Richie Merritt, Matthew McConaughey, Bel Powley, Jennifer Jason Leigh, Brian Tyree Henry, Rory Cochrane, RJ Cyler, Jonathan Majors, Eddie Marsan, Bruce Dern, and Piper Laurie. The film is loosely based on the story of Richard Wershe Jr., who in the 1980s became the youngest FBI informant ever at the age of 14.

White Boy Rick premiered at the Telluride Film Festival on August 31, 2018 and was released in the United States on September 14, 2018, by Sony Pictures Releasing. It received mixed reviews from critics and grossed over $25 million, $4 million short of its $29 million budget.

Plot
In 1984, Rick Wershe is a struggling single father living in Detroit during the height of the crack epidemic and war on drugs. His dissatisfied daughter, Dawn, leaves their home, leaving Rick alone with his son, Ricky. Rick manufactures gun parts and sells guns illegally to make ends meet, and involves his son in the sale of a pair of silenced Egyptian Kalashnikov rifles with local gangster Johnny Curry. Ricky becomes good friends with Johnny's brother, Boo, which earns him the favor of Johnny and his crew. News of Rick's activity attracts the attention of the FBI and he is questioned by two agents, Alex Snyder and Frank Byrd, who see Ricky as a potential asset due to his connections with the criminal underworld. They convince Ricky to become an undercover informant behind Rick's back in exchange for money and immunity for his father. Ricky is asked to sell drugs to keep up appearances, becoming captivated by his extravagant new lifestyle, and eventually gains enough credibility as a "legitimate" drug supplier. Rick is suspicious of his son and confronts Ricky when he finds thousands of dollars in illicit cash underneath his bed, causing a rift between them. While Ricky is meeting with Dawn at a diner one evening, his grandfather's car is stolen, and the two shoot at the fleeing car. They are arrested but bailed out by Ricky's handlers, which arouses suspicion from Johnny.

At a party following a boxing match in Las Vegas, Johnny beats his rival's friend, Black Ed, within an inch of his life with a bottle of champagne. Afterwards, he orders a drive-by on the home of his rival, Leon Lucas, killing one of his young nephews. Ricky learns that the weapons used were the same AKs he had sold to Johnny. Devastated by his involvement in the murder of a child, he keeps a low profile and mends his relationship with his father. Johnny suspects Ricky is an informant and sends Nug to his house, who shoots him in the stomach. While at the hospital, Snyder informs Ricky that they have enough evidence to raid all of Johnny's safe houses, and asks him to forget about the shooting in exchange for dropping all charges on his father.

A year later in 1986, Brenda Moore's brother tells Ricky that Brenda had a daughter named Keisha, and that Ricky is the father. Rick and Ricky come over to see the child, who wins over the affection of both of them. Later on, they find Dawn at a drug den and forcibly take her home to detox. She eventually makes a full recovery after several days.

In 1987, Ricky goes back to selling crack and assumes the role that Johnny left behind, even going so far as having sex with his wife, Cathy. Rick discovers he has earned more than enough money to make his father's dream of opening up a video store come true. FBI agents arrest Ricky and he is held on drug possession with intent to distribute which could land him a potential life sentence. Ricky's former handlers deny their relationship with him, but promise they will try to get his sentence reduced if he cooperates on one last bust. Ricky has Cathy help him out with a large shipment of drugs, the FBI raid the deal, and arrest everyone involved. Ricky is found guilty and is sentenced to life in prison. Rick confronts the two agents about their deal but they feign ignorance.

After another year, Dawn, Rick, and Keisha visit Ricky in prison. Rick tries to give his son hope but Ricky laments that his life is over. Rick tears up and apologizes for not being able to give him an easy life like he wanted. The credits reveal that Ricky was imprisoned for over 30 years, holding the record for the longest prison term for a non-violent offender in the state of Michigan. He was finally released on parole in 2017. His father died in 2014. His daughter, Keisha, is now happily married with two sons. A voice recording of the real Ricky Wershe Jr. plays in the background, saying that nobody thought he should really be in prison, but that he was feeling happy and hopeful.

Cast

 Matthew McConaughey as Richard Wershe Sr.
 Richie Merritt as Richard Wershe Jr.
 Bel Powley as Dawn Wershe
 Jennifer Jason Leigh as FBI Agent Alex Snyder
 Brian Tyree Henry as Detroit PD Vice Detective Mel “Roach” Jackson
 Rory Cochrane as FBI Agent Frank Byrd
 RJ Cyler as Rudell "Boo" Curry
 Jonathan Majors as Johnny "Lil Man" Curry
 Eddie Marsan as Art Derrick
 Taylour Paige as Cathy Volsan-Curry
 Bruce Dern as Grandpa Roman "Ray" Wershe
 Piper Laurie as Grandma Verna Wershe
 Kwon Haynes as Edwin "Nug" Crutcher
 IshDARR as Steven "Freaky Steve” Roussell
 James Howard as Chief Homicide Inspector Hill
 YG as Leo "Big Man" Curry
 Danny Brown as Edward "Black Ed" Hanserd
 Kyanna Simone Simpson as Brenda Moore

Production
In February 2015, Studio 8 acquired a spec script by Logan Miller and Noah Miller, titled White Boy Rick.

In November 2016, Matthew McConaughey joined the cast of the film, with Yann Demange directing the film, Darren Aronofsky, Scott Franklin and John Lesher produced the film under their Protozoa Pictures and LBI Entertainment banners, respectively. In January 2017, Bruce Dern and Jennifer Jason Leigh joined the cast of the film. In February 2017, Bel Powley and Brian Tyree Henry joined the cast of the film. In March 2017, Richie Merritt, Jonathan Majors, YG, Taylour Paige, Piper Laurie and RJ Cyler joined the cast of the film.

Principal photography began on March 14, 2017. Following audience testing, in which the film scored quite high—in the 90s—director Yann Demange was given the go-ahead to shoot extra scenes.

Release
The film was originally scheduled to be released on January 12, 2018, but was pushed back two weeks from its original release date of January 12, 2018, to January 26, 2018, and was pushed back again from January 26, 2018, to August 17, 2018, after successful test screenings. In April 2018 it was pushed back again from August 17, 2018, to September 14, 2018. It had its world premiere at the Telluride Film Festival on August 31, 2018. It was also screened at the 2018 Toronto International Film Festival on September 7, 2018.

Reception

Box office
In the United States and Canada, White Boy Rick  was released alongside The Predator, A Simple Favor and Unbroken: Path to Redemption, and was projected to gross $5–9 million from 2,504 theaters in its opening weekend. It ended up debuting to $8.8 million, finishing fourth behind The Predator, The Nun and A Simple Favor. It dropped 43% in its second weekend to $5 million, finishing sixth.

Critical response
The site's critical consensus reads, "Solid work from the cast - particularly a scene-stealing Matthew McConaughey - helps White Boy Rick make up for a number of missed opportunities in the script." On Metacritic, the film has a weighted average score of 59 out of 100, based on 35 critics, indicating "mixed or average reviews". Audiences polled by CinemaScore gave the film an average grade of "B" on an A+ to F scale, while PostTrak reported filmgoers gave it a 64% positive score and a 44% "definite recommend".

See also
 White Boy (film)

References

External links
 
 
 
 
 

2018 crime drama films
American crime drama films
Columbia Pictures films
Crime films based on actual events
Drama films based on actual events
Films set in the 1980s
Hood films
Films about drugs
Films produced by Darren Aronofsky
Films shot in Cleveland
Films set in Detroit
Protozoa Pictures films
Films scored by Max Richter
Films about father–son relationships
2010s English-language films
2010s American films